Eupalin is a flavonol. It is the eupalitin 3-O-rhamnoside. It can be isolated from Eupatorium ligustrinum.

References 

O-methylated flavonols
Flavonol rhamnosides